HMIS Dufferin was a troopship of 7,457 tonnes active with the Royal Indian Marine. The Dufferin was built to transport troops in south-east Asia and Africa.

Service
During World War I, Dufferin was one of the British vessels sent on an expedition into the Red Sea to support the Arab Revolt against the Ottomans.

At the Battle of Aqaba (6 July 1917) the forces of the Arab Revolt, advised by T. E. Lawrence ("Lawrence of Arabia"), captured the Red Sea port of Aqaba, and took 700 Ottoman prisoners of war (POW), including 42 officers. In the aftermath, Lawrence convinced Admiral Wemyss to send Dufferin to Aqaba with food, on the return trip taking the prisoners to be interned at a POW camp in Egypt.

References

Sources

  Dittmar; Colledge. British Warships 1914–1919. p. 321.
  The Navy List. (December, 1914). p. 399c.
  The Navy List. (December, 1918). p. 954.

External links
 H.M.S._Dufferin_(1904) entry on The Dreadnought Project

1904 ships